"Wisdom" was the third single released by David Gray, released on 14 June 1993, and taken from his debut album A Century Ends. The single and its B-sides were later included on the 2001 compilation The EPs 1992–1994.

Track listing
 "Wisdom" – 4:15
 "Lovers" – 3:22
 "4AM" – 2:42

References

David Gray (musician) songs
1993 singles
Songs written by David Gray (musician)
1993 songs
Hut Records singles
Virgin Records singles
Music videos directed by Lindy Heymann